Zachary Christian "Zack" Walz (born February 13, 1976) is a former professional American football linebacker in the National Football League. He was drafted with the 5th pick of the 6th round and played four seasons for the Arizona Cardinals. He was named as the starting outside linebacker his second and third years before season ending injuries cut both seasons and ultimately his career, short. Walz was a 3-year starter at Dartmouth, a 3-time Unanimous 1st Team All-Ivy Selection, Team Captain and currently sits third all time for tackles in a career with 356. He attended Saint Francis High School in Mountain View, California. He currently resides in Arizona with his wife, Annette and kids. Walz had a close relationship with Cardinals teammate and future army member Pat Tillman. They both grew up playing high school football in Northern California where they would eventually play against each other in a senior all star game. Pat and Zack were drafted one round apart in 1998. They were roommates during their time together with the Arizona Cardinals. During his rookie year, Walz didn't bring the veterans breakfast as instructed And was subsequently taped to a goal post. Tilman saw this, grabbed scissors, walked outside, and despite being told by veterans not to help, he cut Walz down. This story was the subject of commentary by Coach Dave McGinnis in “Pat Tillman: A Football Life”

References

1976 births
Living people
American football linebackers
Arizona Cardinals players
Dartmouth Big Green football players
People from Mountain View, California
Players of American football from California
Sportspeople from Santa Clara County, California